The Wingard Ferry is a cable ferry in the Canadian province of Saskatchewan near Wingard, Saskatchewan.  The ferry crosses the North Saskatchewan River, as part of Grid Road 783.

The six-car ferry is operated by the Saskatchewan Ministry of Highways and Infrastructure. The ferry is free of tolls and operates between 7:00 am and midnight, during the ice-free season.

The ferry transports approximately 10,000 vehicles a year.

See also 
 List of crossings of the North Saskatchewan River

References 

Duck Lake No. 463, Saskatchewan
Ferries of Saskatchewan
Cable ferries in Canada
Leask No. 464, Saskatchewan
Division No. 15, Saskatchewan